Maryse Éwanjé-Épée (born September 4, 1964, in Poitiers, France) is a retired high jumper from France.

Biography
Maryse Éwanjé-Épée set her outdoor personal best on July 21, 1985, jumping 1.96 metres at the French National Athletics Championships in Colombes, France. That was a French national outdoor record that was not bettered or equalled for the next 22 years. Melanie Melfort equalled it by jumping 1.96 metres on August 11, 2007. Éwanjé-Épée's indoor personal best was 1.95 metres, set in 1984.

Éwanjé-Épée won three high jump medals (one silver and two bronzes) at the European Indoor Championships, one high jump bronze medal at the Summer Universiade and one high jump gold medal each at the Jeux de la Francophonie and the Mediterranean Games. She competed for France in the high jump in two consecutive Summer Olympics in 1984 and 1988. She finished 4th and 10th in the Olympic high jump final of 1984 and 1988 respectively. She could not take part in the 1992 and 1996 Summer Olympics because of her failure to clear the minimum Olympic qualifying height by a mere centimetre for both of these Olympics. She won eight indoor high jump and eight outdoor high jump French National Athletics Championships titles at the senior level from 1982 to 1996.

Éwanjé-Épée also attended the University of Arizona, in Tucson (United States) and she still holds the heptathlon record since that time. She held the NCAA high jump record from 1985 to 1996 with 1.96 meters. In 1985, Arizona went 1–2–3 in the NCAA with Katrena Johnson in first place, Maryse Éwanjé-Épée in second, and Camille Harding in third.

After her retirement from high jumping competition in 1996, Éwanjé-Épée worked as a television sports interviewer, sports administrator, sport consultant and radio/television presenter. She is also the writer of three books among those, a biography of Jesse Owens: Jesse, la fabuleuse histoire de Jesse Owens, aux éditions José Carlin/Jacques-Marie Laffont Éditions, 2016

Éwanjé-Épée speaks French, English and Spanish fluently.

Éwanjé-Épée's father, Charles Éwanjé-Épée, is a Camerounian guitarist-singer-songwriter.  Her mother, Geneviève Pujol, had a Spanish Catalan grandfather. Maryse Éwanjé-Épée has three sisters and no brothers; her younger sister, Monique Éwanjé-Épée, competed for France in the 60m hurdles and 100m hurdles.

Maryse Éwanjé-Épée married Marc Maury in 1988. They have three daughters (Mélissa, Tanya, Maïa) and one son (Mikka). She and Marc Maury divorced in 2007.

Results in international competitions
Note: Only the position and height in the final are indicated, unless otherwise stated. (q) means the athlete did not qualify for the final, with the overall position and height in the qualification round indicated.

References

External links
 
 
 World women's all-time best high jump

1964 births
Living people
French female high jumpers
Sportspeople from Poitiers
French sportspeople of Cameroonian descent
French people of Catalan descent
Athletes (track and field) at the 1984 Summer Olympics
Athletes (track and field) at the 1988 Summer Olympics
Olympic athletes of France
Mediterranean Games gold medalists for France
Athletes (track and field) at the 1983 Mediterranean Games
Universiade medalists in athletics (track and field)
Mediterranean Games medalists in athletics
Universiade bronze medalists for France